Hans Bild (28 January 1926 – 15 May 2004) was a German footballer who played for Borussia Neunkirchen and the Saarland national team as a forward.

References

1926 births
2004 deaths
German footballers
Saar footballers
Saarland international footballers
Borussia Neunkirchen players
Association football forwards